This is the list of äkıms of East Kazakhstan Region that have held the position since 1992.

List of Äkıms 

 Amangeldı Bektemısov (10 February 1992 – 17 June 1994)
 Yuri Lavrinenko (17 June 1994 – 28 November 1995)
 Leonid Desyatnik (28 November 1995 – 29 April 1996)
 Qajymūrat Nağymanov (29 April 1996 – 10 April 1997)
 Vitaly Mette (17 April 1997 – 26 February 2003)
 Talğatbek Abaidıldin (26 February 2003 – 8 December 2004)
 Viktor Khrapunov (8 December 2004 – 11 January 2007)
 Jänıbek Kärıbjanov (11 January 2007 – 7 May 2008)
 Ädılğazy Bergenov (7 May 2008 – 4 March 2009)
 Berdıbek Saparbaev (4 March 2009 – 11 November 2014)
 Danial Ahmetov (11 November 2014 – present)

References 

Government of Kazakhstan